Tombstone Rashomon is a 2017 Western film directed by Alex Cox and starring Adam Newberry and Eric Schumacher. It tells the story of the Gunfight at the O.K. Corral in Tombstone, Arizona Territory, from multiple differing perspectives in the style of Akira Kurosawa's 1950 film Rashomon.

Plot synopsis
A film crew travels back in time to film the Gunfight at the O.K. Corral. They arrive after the gunfight, however, and can only interview those involved. They interview Wyatt Earp, Doc Holliday, Kate, Ike Clanton, Colonel Roderick Hafford, and Johnny Behan, each of whom has a different take on the events.

Cast

 Adam Newberry as Wyatt Earp
 Jesse Lee Pacheco as Johnny Behan
 Christine Doidge as Kate
 Eric Schumacher as Doc Holliday
 Benny Lee Kennedy as Ike Clanton
 Richard Anderson as Hafford
 Jason Graham as Virgil Earp
 Shayn Herndon as Morgan Earp
 Michele Bauer as Allie Earp
 Haydn Winston as Frank McLaury
 Bradford Trojan as Tom McLaury
 James Miller as Billy Clanton
 Callie Hutchison as Mattie Earp
 Rogelio Camarillo as Billy Claiborne
 Brenda Jean Foley as Mollie Fly
 Frank Gonzalez as Ned Boyle
 Wade Everett as William B. Murray
 Pablo Kjolseth as C.S. Fly
 Geoff Marslett as Charles Shibell
 Merritt Crocker as Bill Leonard
 Carlos Abdalla as Albert Behan
 Oz as William Baron (barber)
 Frank Balden as Keefe
 Jeremy Hamley as Sheriff's Deputy
 Susan Sebanc as Interviewer
 William Long as Bartender
 Khameiah Williamson as Butcher
 Steve Burton as Blacksmith
 Charles Scanlon as Ed Schieffelin

Production
As with his previous film Bill, the Galactic Hero (2014), Alex Cox used crowdfunding to finance the production of the film. This time he used an Indiegogo campaign.

In an interview with IndieWire, Cox stated, "I was thinking it would be a conventional western, but Rudy (Wurlitzer) wants to give it a science fiction angle — from the perspective of time-traveling women historians from the future. They’ll time-travel back in time to film at the OK Corral, but they get the day wrong and they miss it by a day, so they have to interview the survivors." Wurlitzer was involved in early stages, but not credited as a writer on the final film, the screenplay is solely credited to Cox.

In an interview with The Huffington Post, Cox stated that he had originally planned to film in Boulder, Colorado, but then decided to shoot in Tucson instead.

Filming took place at the Old Tucson Studios west of Tucson. In an interview with Tucson Weekly, Cox stated that the producers of Snowden matched the funds already accumulated, helping Cox to complete the film.

Release
The film screened as a work in progress at the Ashland Independent Film Festival at 6:40 p.m. on Saturday, April 8, 2017, at the Cinedelphia Film Festival at 7:00 p.m. on April 15, 2017, and at the Loft Film Fest on May 27, 2017.

References

External links
 

2017 films
2010s English-language films
Films directed by Alex Cox
Films set in the 1880s
Films shot in Tucson, Arizona
Films set in Arizona
Cultural depictions of Wyatt Earp
Cultural depictions of Doc Holliday
Cultural depictions of Big Nose Kate
American Western (genre) films
Crowdfunded films
Films about time travel
2017 Western (genre) films
2010s American films